Aenetus arfaki is a moth of the family Hepialidae described by George Thomas Bethune-Baker in 1910. It is known from the Arfak Mountains in New Guinea.

References

Moths described in 1910
Hepialidae